ㅗ is one of the Korean hangul. The Unicode for ㅗ is U+3151.

Stroke order

Hangul jamo
Vowel letters